Esther is a British talk show presented by Esther Rantzen. It was aired on BBC Two between 24 October 1994 and 10 May 2002 and over 600 episodes were made.

References

External links
 

1994 British television series debuts
2002 British television series endings
1990s British television talk shows
2000s British television talk shows
BBC television talk shows
English-language television shows